Pigeon Township is one of ten townships in Warrick County, Indiana, United States. As of the 2010 census, its population was 979 and it contained 436 housing units.

History
Pigeon Township was created out of Owen Township in September 1849. The township derives its name from the Little Pigeon River.

Geography

Unincorporated towns
 Heilman at 
 Loafers Station at 
 Selvin at 
(This list is based on USGS data and may include former settlements.)

Adjacent townships
 Cass Township, Dubois County (northeast)
 Carter Township, Spencer County (east)
 Clay Township, Spencer County (southeast)
 Jackson Township, Spencer County (south)
 Skelton Township (southwest)
 Lane Township (west)
 Owen Township (west)
 Lockhart Township, Pike County (northwest)

Cemeteries
The township contains these five cemeteries: Avery, Bruce, Chinn, Twin and Wetherill.

School districts
 Warrick County School Corporation

Political districts
 Indiana's 8th congressional district
 State House District 74
 State Senate District 47

References
 United States Census Bureau 2007 TIGER/Line Shapefiles
 United States Board on Geographic Names (GNIS)
 IndianaMap

External links
 Indiana Township Association
 United Township Association of Indiana

Townships in Warrick County, Indiana
Townships in Indiana